Wisconsin, a state in the Midwestern United States, has a vast and diverse geography famous for its landforms created by glaciers during the Wisconsin glaciation 17,000 years ago. The state can be generally divided into five geographic regions—Lake Superior Lowland, Northern Highland, Central Plain, Eastern Ridges & Lowlands, and Western Upland. The southwestern part of the state, which was not covered by glaciers during the most recent ice age, is known as the Driftless Area. The Wisconsin glaciation formed the Wisconsin Dells, Devil's Lake, and the Baraboo Range. A number of areas are protected in the state, including Devil's Lake State Park, the Apostle Islands National Lakeshore, and the Chequamegon–Nicolet National Forest.

Wisconsin has a humid continental climate across the entire state, with four seasons. The state is bounded by several rivers—the Mississippi, St. Croix, and Menominee rivers—and lakes Michigan and Superior.

Location and size 

Wisconsin is located in the East North Central United States, and is considered to be a part of the Midwest. Of this area, 17% is water, primarily Lake Michigan, Superior, and the many inland lakes in Wisconsin.

Wisconsin is bordered by Lake Superior and Michigan to the north; by Lake Michigan to the east; by Illinois to the south; by Iowa to the southwest and Minnesota to the northwest. A border dispute with Michigan was settled by two cases, both Wisconsin v. Michigan, in 1934 and 1935. The state's boundaries include the Mississippi and St. Croix Rivers in the west, and the Menominee and Montreal Rivers in the north. The state is in Central Time Zone (UTC-6).

Human geography 

As of the 2020 census, Wisconsin had a population of 5,893,718, and ranked 27th in the United States in population density. The center of population is located in Green Lake County, in the city of Markesan.

Wisconsin is divided into 72 counties, and has 190 cities, 407 villages, and 1250 towns. Approximately 939,489 residents live in Milwaukee County, making it both the most populous and most densely populated county. Most of its residents live in the city of Milwaukee, which is the most populous city in the state. Madison, in Dane County, is the capital of the state. Dane County has 561,504 residents, making it the second-most populous. Marathon County is the largest in area, having . This county contains the 45°N, 90°W point, one of four points that are halfway between both the poles and equator, and between both the Prime and 180th meridian. The location is noted by a metal ground marker.

Climate 

Most of Wisconsin has a warm-summer humid continental climate (Köppen Dfb), while southern and southwestern portions are classified as hot-summer humid continental climate (Köppen Dfa). The highest temperature ever recorded in the state was in the Wisconsin Dells, on July 13, 1936, where it reached . The lowest temperature ever recorded was in the village of Couderay, where it reached  on both February 2 and 4, 1996.

Geographic regions 

Wisconsin, located between the Great Lakes and the Mississippi River, is home to a wide variety of geographical features. The state can generally be divided into five distinct regions—Lake Superior Lowland, Northern Highland, Central Plain, Western Upland, and Eastern Ridges & Lowlands. Lawrence Martin created this schema for dividing the state into geographic regions. The different regions are defined by the differing effects of glaciers during the Wisconsin glaciation.In the north, the Lake Superior Lowland occupies a belt of land along Lake Superior. The region is a flat plain, gently sloping downward to Lake Superior. Much of the area is forested—dominated by aspen and birch trees. The region also includes the Apostle Islands National Lakeshore. In the north-central part of the state, the Northern Highland has massive mixed hardwood and coniferous forests including the  Chequamegon-Nicolet National Forest, as well as thousands of glacial lakes. The terrain is generally higher than the rest of the state, with frequent hills, and includes the state's highest point, Timms Hill.
In the middle of the state, the Central Plain has many unique sandstone formations like the Dells of the Wisconsin River, in addition to rich farmland. The region is generally a flat sandy plain, much of which was covered by Glacial Lake Wisconsin. In the southwest, the Western Upland is a rugged landscape with a mix of forest and farmland, including many bluffs on the Mississippi River. The region is defined by its hilly irregular terrain, including all the Baraboo Range. The Western Upland is part of the Driftless Area, which also includes portions of Iowa, Illinois, and Minnesota. This area was not covered by glaciers during the most recent ice age, the Wisconsin Glaciation. This area contains many of the caves in Wisconsin, including the Natural Landmark Cave of the Mounds. Langlade County has a soil rarely found outside of the county called Antigo silt loam.

The Eastern Ridges and Lowlands region, in the southeast, is home to many of the state's largest cities. The region is located west of Lake Michigan, and is primarily a plain, sloping down to the lake. The ridges include the Niagara Escarpment, the Black River Escarpment, and the Magnesian Escarpment.

Geology

Wisconsin has geologic formations and deposits that vary in age from over three billion years to several thousand years, with most rocks being millions of years old. The oldest geologic formations were created over 600 million years ago during the Precambrian, with the majority being below the glacial deposits. Proterozoic rocks form much of Wisconsin's unique deposits. Much of the Baraboo Range consists of Baraboo Quartzite, and other Precambrian metamorphic rock.

During the Pleistocene, massive glaciers covered Wisconsin. The glaciers flattened mountains, carved bedrock, and deposited sand and gravel in many areas of the state. The many lakes are a result of this glaciation carving out low spots in the terrain.

Various escarpments cut through Wisconsin. The Niagara Escarpment is the longest, running from New York through Ontario, Michigan, Wisconsin, and Illinois. The Black River Escarpment runs near the Niagara Escarpment. The Magnesian Escarpment is the most prominent, running north to south. The bedrock of the Niagara Escarpment is dolomite, while the two shorter ridges have limestone bedrock.

Physical geography

Rivers 

Wisconsin is bordered by the Mississippi River and St. Croix River to the west. The state has more than 12,000 named rivers and streams, totaling  in length.

Its name is derived from the Algonquin languages of the indigenous people. The name was first recorded as "Meskousing" by Jacques Marquette in 1673, but was later modified to "Ouisconsin" by later French explorers in the 18th century. The name was finally simplified to "Wisconsin" in the 19th century, as it was applied to the new Wisconsin Territory. The river originates in the Lac Vieux Desert near the border with the Upper Peninsula of Michigan. The Baraboo River is a tributary, and one of the longest free flowing waterways in the United States.

The Fox River originates in central Wisconsin, flowing northward through Lake Winnebago, and into the Bay of Green Bay, with the city of Green Bay being at its mouth. The two sections of the Fox River total , and counting the distance through Lake Winnebago gives . The name is derived from a translation of the name of the Meskwaki people, as the river runs through their territory. The Fox Cities metropolitan area includes many cities along the river.

Lakes 

Wisconsin is bordered by Lake Superior in the north and Lake Michigan in the east. Within Wisconsin, Lakes Superior and Michigan total . The lake was derived from Glacial Lake Oshkosh approximately 12,000 years ago. Devil's Lake is rectangular in shape, and is over a mile long from north to south, and a half mile east to west.

Islands

A lot of the named islands in Wisconsin are in the Great Lakes. Many surround the Door Peninsula in Lake Michigan, or are part of the Apostle Islands in Lake Superior. The Mississippi River also has a multitude of islands on the state's western boundary. Inland lakes and rivers contain the rest of the islands of Wisconsin. Many lakes, including Beaver Dam Lake, Fox Lake, and Lake Winnebago, have an abundance of islands. Large rivers, like the Wisconsin River and Fox River, have many islands as well. Doty Island, in the Fox River, is one mile wide and one and a half miles long.

Madeline Island in Lake Superior is the largest of the Apostle Islands. The community of La Pointe is on the western shore, and the island as a whole has a population of 302. The town of Washington Island covers the island, as well as surrounding islands, with a total population of 708.

Protected areas 

Wisconsin has 67 state parks, covering more than 60,570 acres (245.1 km2), and several are nationally recognized. The Ice Age National Scenic Trail runs through the park. Interstate State Park consists of two adjacent state parks on the Minnesota–Wisconsin border. The parks straddle the Dalles of the St. Croix River, a deep basalt gorge.

Wisconsin also has protected areas under the management of the National Park Service. The Apostle Islands National Lakeshore, along Lake Superior, is a national lakeshore consisting of 21 of the Apostle Islands, totaling . The Ice Age Trail is a National Scenic Trail covering , following the terminal moraine of the Wisconsin Glaciation. The western terminus is located in Interstate State Park, and the eastern end is in Potawatomi State Park, along the Door Peninsula. The trail passes through 30 of Wisconsin's 72 counties. The Saint Croix National Scenic Riverway protects  of the St. Croix and Namekagon Rivers.

The principal feature of the forest is the Kettle Moraine, which was created during the Wisconsin Glaciation. There is one national forest managed by the U.S. Forest Service in the state, Chequamegon-Nicolet National Forest. It was established in 1933 as two separate forests, but has been maintained as a single entity since 1998.

References

Citations

General sources